Malvind Singh Benning (born 2 November 1993) is an English professional footballer who plays for  club Port Vale. An attacking left-back, whose parents are Indian Sikhs, he is one of a small number of British Asians in association football.

He began his career with Walsall and had loan spells with Evesham United and York City. He made his debut in the English Football League at Walsall in November 2012 and went on to feature 53 times in total, before signing with Mansfield Town in May 2015. He spent six seasons with Mansfield, making 251 appearances in all competitions. He signed with Port Vale in June 2021 and helped the club to win promotion out of League Two via the play-offs in 2022.

Early and personal life
Benning, whose parents are Indian Sikhs, was born in West Bromwich, West Midlands. He was educated at Queen Mary's Grammar School and is a Liverpool supporter.

He was named on Kick It Out's new advisory board in June 2021; Benning had been targeted for racist abuse on Twitter in January 2020, which was reported to the police by the Professional Footballers' Association, though Benning stated that other than that he had "not experienced much 'racism' as one of very few Asian players in the professional game" (0.25% of the 3,700 professional players in 2020 were British Asian).

Club career

Walsall
Benning started his career with Walsall, progressing through the youth system from the under-8 side. He played as a midfielder before gaining weight and being moved to left-back in his early teenage years. In January 2012, he joined Non-League club Evesham United, who played in the Southern League Premier Division, on a youth loan. He made his first-team debut for Walsall at the Bescot Stadium on 6 November 2012, in a 4–1 defeat to Scunthorpe United in League One, coming on as a substitute for James Chambers. He signed his first professional contract, of two and a half years, in January 2013. He went on to start seven games and make four substitute appearances in the 2012–13 season. On 5 March 2014, he scored his first goal in senior football in a 2–1 defeat at Coventry City. He claimed another goal in a 3–2 defeat at Stevenage the following month, and ended the 2013–14 season with fifteen starts and three appearances from the bench. He was played mainly at right-back in his early career, keeping the experienced Ben Purkiss out of the team.

Benning joined League Two club York City on 22 January 2015 on a one-month loan, with manager Russ Wilcox looking to provide competition for the ever-present Femi Ilesanmi. He made his debut in a 1–1 home draw with Burton Albion two days later and his loan was extended by a second month in February 2015. Having made nine appearances he was recalled by Walsall on 16 March 2015 after an injury to Andy Taylor. He made 13 starts and 11 substitute appearances for Walsall in the 2014–15 season, and was often played further up the pitch from his familiar left-back position by manager Dean Smith. Benning was released in May 2015.

Mansfield Town
Benning signed for League Two club Mansfield Town on 22 May 2015. He suffered a cruciate knee ligament injury in October 2015 and was out of action for four months; he tested his recovery from the injury by tackling a brick wall. Manager Adam Murray had initially worried that Benning could be ruled out for the whole of the 2015–16 season, but it transpired that no surgery was necessary to repair the damage as 12 weeks in a brace was sufficient to allow the body to heal itself. He signed a new contract of undisclosed length in May 2016, having scored four goals from 33 games. He missed just one league and one EFL Trophy game during the 2016–17 season, playing a total of 52 times and scoring one goal, as the club posted a 12th-place finish. He told the media that new manager Steve Evans had "made an impact instantly" and "made it clear that he's striving for promotion", but that for Benning "the main focus is to keep my place in the team".

He signed a new one-year contract in February 2018. However, he was sent off in a 1–0 defeat to Accrington Stanley at Field Mill on 31 March, a lack of discipline which caused him to be criticised by newly-appointed manager David Flitcroft. He scored a winning goal against local rivals Chesterfield on 14 April, which earned him the nickname "Sir Mal" from supporters. This was his only goal from 34 appearances in the 2017–18 season, one in which Mansfield finished one place outside the play-offs. Benning adapted well to the new manager's wing-back system and after he increased his running statistics towards the end of the season credited Flitcroft's work ethic in training for his improved fitness levels.

Benning featured 55 times over the course of the 2018–19 season, missing just one league game. Mansfield finished in fourth place but were beaten on penalties by Newport County in the semi-finals of the play-offs despite Benning converting his penalty. Flitcroft was sacked after the defeat, though Benning said that he was ready to focus on football again after returning from holiday in Mexico and that he and the rest of the squad had had positive meetings with new manager John Dempster. However, the new season went poorly and Dempster was replaced by Graham Coughlan in December. Benning played 39 games in the 2019–20 season, which saw Mansfield finish 21st on points per game after the season was curtailed early due to the COVID-19 pandemic in England.

He lost his left-back position to Stephen McLaughlin during the 2020–21 season. However, he would regain his first-team spot and earned praise for his consistency from manager Nigel Clough in January. On 27 April 2021, it was announced that he would leave Mansfield to "seek a new challenge" with the decision made "amicably and mutually", having made 251 appearances in a six-year stay at the club. He stated that "one massive regret is to not have been able to help get the club promoted"; he was the 18th highest appearance maker in the club's history at the time of his departure.

Port Vale

On 28 June 2021, Benning agreed a one-year contract with Port Vale, to begin on 1 July; he was signed to compete with fellow new arrival Dan Jones. He started five of the "Valiants" first seven League Two games of the 2021–22 season, but admitted that "I think there is a lot more to come from me... I feel like I can do a lot more". He was dropped to the bench after James Gibbons returned from injury, but came on as a half-time substitute to score his first goal at Vale Park in a 3–1 win over Barrow on 16 October. He was limited to 17 league starts in the 2021–22 campaign, but would score the winning penalty kick in the penalty shoot-out victory over Swindon Town in the play-off semi-finals. He started in the play-off final at Wembley Stadium and scored Vale's final goal as they secured promotion with a 3–0 victory over former club Mansfield Town; Michael Baggaley of The Sentinel wrote that Benning was "excellent" and he "set up Harratt’s opener, went close to scoring in the first half then confirmed Vale’s victory with a sliding volley for the third five minutes from time". He signed a new one-year contract in June 2022.

He enjoyed an excellent run of form at the start of the 2022–23 season, maintaining a first-team place despite competition for the left-wing back position from Dan Jones, Liam McCarron and Thierry Small, whilst Chris Hussey was allowed to leave the club. Speaking in December, manager Darrell Clarke said that Benning  "has defended very, very well; it hasn't been one of his main strengths but he has been good going forward, he has added that to his game and been ultra-consistent".

International career
Benning stated his desire to represent India national team in August 2015 but said he was unable to as the nation's strict rules on eligibility meant he would have to first give up his British passport and get an Indian passport.

Style of play
Benning is an attacking left-back, who is also able to play at left wing-back. He has pace and good crossing ability, also boasting good free kick and volleying skills.

Career statistics

Honours
Port Vale
EFL League Two play-offs: 2022

References

External links

Profile at the Port Vale F.C. website

1993 births
Association football defenders
British Asian footballers
English Football League players
English footballers
English people of Punjabi descent
English Sikhs
British sportspeople of Indian descent
Evesham United F.C. players
Footballers from the West Midlands (county)
Living people
Mansfield Town F.C. players
Port Vale F.C. players
People educated at Queen Mary's Grammar School
Southern Football League players
Sportspeople from West Bromwich
Walsall F.C. players
York City F.C. players